Pennsylvania Railroad No. 1223 is a class "D16sb" 4-4-0 "American" type steam locomotive built in November 1905 for the Pennsylvania Railroad by their own Altoona Works for passenger service. After being retired from active service in 1950, the locomotive ran excursion trains on the Strasburg Rail Road outside of Strasburg, Pennsylvania from 1965 to 1989 when it was removed from service requiring firebox repairs. Currently, the locomotive is still on static display at the Railroad Museum of Pennsylvania outside of Strasburg. It was listed on the National Register of Historic Places in 1979. No. 1223 is the only surviving example of the Pennsylvania Railroad's D16sb class.

History

Revenue service 

The class D16 locomotives of the Pennsylvania Railroad (PRR) were the most modern of a long history of 4-4-0 "American" type steam locomotives that the railroad used. No. 1223 was home built by PRR at its Juniata Shops in Altoona, Pennsylvania in 1905. As built, it was a high speed passenger engine with tall driving wheels. However, the 4-4-0 type—long the mainstay of American passenger and freight service—was already becoming outmoded when No. 1223 was built, being superseded by ever-larger engines. PRR itself was pioneering steel passenger cars, which the public soon demanded for the implied increases in safety. No. 1223 was eventually rebuilt with smaller driving wheels for local freight service, having been replaced on passenger trains by engines like the class "E6" Atlantics and class "K4" Pacifics. It was modernized as well, receiving superheaters (the "s" in D-16sb), piston valves, an electric headlight and other improvements. By 1940, most railroads had forgotten about the 4-4-0, but PRR , Boston & Maine and Canadian Pacific Railway, were still using them. Nos. 1035, 1223 and 5079 were all leased to the Baltimore, Chesapeake & Atlantic Railway working such routes as the McDaniel Branch and the Love Point to Easton line. No. 1223 was scheduled for scrapping when a PRR officer noticed her and ordered renovation to almost original condition in 1937. On 1941, PRR 3750 & PRR 1223 made an appearance in Broadway Limited (film) masquerading as PRR 1600. Of the three, No. 1223 was selected for display at a number of railroad fairs in the 1930s-1950s, and eventual preservation. For years, the engine was stored at a roundhouse in Northumberland, Pennsylvania.

Excursion service 

On 1965, the Strasburg Railroad (SRC), based in Strasburg, Pennsylvania, leased No. 1223 from PRR and restored it to operating condition on August 14, 1965. The Engine pulled the Santa Claus Special at Lancaster, PA annually in December 1965-1968. PRR No. 1223 appeared in another movie called Hello Dolly (1969) it was painted as New York Central & Hudson River Railroad (NYC&HR) #15. 

On December 17, 1979, PRR No. 1223 was placed on the National Register of Historic Places as "Passenger Locomotive no. 1223" by the United States Department of the Interior. In June 1982 on the eve of the Strasburg Railroad's 150th anniversary, PRR 1223 was dressed up to represent the "Pennsylvania Railroad". 

On August 1, 1983, No. 1223 was joined by PRR 7002 on Strasburg's roster and the two would operate a few mainline doubleheaders together in 1985 and 1986. The locomotive spent most of the 1980s pulling Strasburg's half hour trains but also made appearances at special events such as the 85th anniversary of the Broadway Limited in 1987, and an off-property trip to Delaware for Dupont in 1988. No. 1223 made its last run on October 26, 1989, after which, Strasburg's newly acquired ultrasound device revealed that the firebox walls of both No. 1223 and No. 7002 were not thick enough to comply with the updated Federal Railroad Administration regulations, thus deeming the engines unsafe for operation.

Disposition 
Strasburg declined to make the necessary repairs as the engines did not belong to them. Moreover, the museum preferred to keep the original fabric of their equipment intact, resulting in SRC withdrawing both locomotives from service at the end of the 1989 season and allowing their leases to expire. On June 4, 2010, PRR 7002 & PRR 1223 were "fired up" using pyrotechnics for a photo charter. After retirement from excursion service on the SRC and return to the RRMPA, it is unlikely the locomotives will return to service. D16sb 1223 is still on indoor static display at the Railroad Museum of Pennsylvania along with 4-4-2 No. (8063) 7002.

See also 
National Register of Historic Places listings in Lancaster County, Pennsylvania

References 

4-4-0 locomotives
Individual locomotives of the United States
1223
Railway locomotives on the National Register of Historic Places in Pennsylvania
Collection of the Railroad Museum of Pennsylvania
Standard gauge locomotives of the United States
National Register of Historic Places in Lancaster County, Pennsylvania
Preserved steam locomotives of Pennsylvania